The Anti-Ballistic Missile Treaty (ABM Treaty or ABMT) (1972–2002) was an arms control treaty between the United States and the Soviet Union on the limitation of the anti-ballistic missile (ABM) systems used in defending areas against ballistic missile-delivered nuclear weapons. It was intended to reduce pressures to build more nuclear weapons to maintain deterrence. Under the terms of the treaty, each party was limited to two ABM complexes, each of which was to be limited to 100 anti-ballistic missiles.

Signed in 1972, it was in force for the next 30 years. In 1997, five years after the dissolution of the Soviet Union, four former Soviet republics agreed with the United States to succeed the USSR's role in the treaty. Citing risks of nuclear blackmail, the United States withdrew from the treaty in June 2002, leading to its termination.

Background

Throughout the late 1950s and into the 1960s, the United States and the Soviet Union had been developing missile systems with the ability to shoot down incoming Intercontinental ballistic missile (ICBM) warheads.  During this period, the US considered the defense of the US as part of reducing the overall damage inflicted in a full nuclear exchange. As part of this defense, Canada and the US established the North American Air Defense Command (now called North American Aerospace Defense Command).

By the early 1950s, US research on the Nike Zeus missile system had developed to the point where small improvements would allow it to be used as the basis of an operational ABM system. Work started on a short-range, high-speed counterpart known as Sprint to provide defense for the ABM sites themselves. By the mid-1960s, both systems showed enough promise to start development of base selection for a limited ABM system dubbed Sentinel. In 1967, the US announced that Sentinel itself would be scaled down to the smaller and less expensive Safeguard. Soviet doctrine called for development of its own ABM system and return to strategic parity with the US. This was achieved with the operational deployment of the A-35 ABM system and its successors, which remain operational to this day.

The development of multiple independently targetable reentry vehicle (MIRV) systems allowed a single ICBM to deliver as many as ten separate warheads at a time.  An ABM defense system could be overwhelmed with the sheer number of warheads. Upgrading it to counter the additional warheads would be economically unfeasible: The defenders required one rocket per incoming warhead, whereas the attackers could place 10 warheads on a single missile at a reasonable cost. To further protect against ABM systems, the Soviet MIRV missiles were equipped with decoys; R-36M heavy missiles carried as many as 40. These decoys would appear as warheads to an ABM, effectively requiring engagement of five times as many targets and rendering defense even less effective.

ABM Treaty

The United States first proposed an anti-ballistic missile treaty at the 1967 Glassboro Summit Conference during discussions between U.S. Secretary of Defense Robert McNamara and Chairman of the Council of Ministers of the Soviet Union Alexei Kosygin.  McNamara argued both that ballistic missile defense could provoke an arms race, and that it might provoke a first-strike against the nation fielding the defense. Kosygin rejected this reasoning. They were trying to minimize the number of nuclear missiles in the world. Following the proposal of the Sentinel and Safeguard decisions on American ABM systems, the Strategic Arms Limitation Talks began in November 1969 (SALT I). By 1972 an agreement had been reached to limit strategic defensive systems. Each country was allowed two sites at which it could base a defensive system, one for the capital and one for ICBM silos.

The treaty was signed during the 1972 Moscow Summit on 26 May by the President of the United States, Richard Nixon and the General Secretary of the Communist Party of the Soviet Union, Leonid Brezhnev; and ratified by the US Senate on 3 August 1972.

The 1974 Protocol reduced the number of sites to one per party, largely because neither country had developed a second site. The sites were Moscow for the USSR and the North Dakota Safeguard Complex for the US, which was already under construction.

Missiles limited by the treaty
The Treaty limited only ABMs capable of defending against "strategic ballistic missiles", without attempting to define "strategic". It was understood that both ICBMs and SLBMs are obviously "strategic". Neither country intended to stop the development of counter-tactical ABMs. The topic became disputable as soon as most potent counter-tactical ABMs started to be capable of shooting down SLBMs (SLBMs naturally tend to be much slower than ICBMs), nevertheless both sides continued counter-tactical ABM development.

After the SDI announcement

On 23 March 1983, Ronald Reagan announced the Strategic Defense Initiative, a research program into ballistic missile defense which would be "consistent with our obligations under the ABM Treaty". Reagan was wary of mutual deterrence with what he had recently called an "Evil Empire", and wanted to escape the traditional confines of mutual assured destruction. The project was a blow to Yuri Andropov's so-called "peace offensive". Andropov said that "It is time [Washington] stopped thinking up one option after another in search of the best way of unleashing nuclear war in the hope of winning it. To do this is not just irresponsible. It is madness".

Regardless of the opposition, Reagan gave every indication that SDI would not be used as a bargaining chip and that the United States would do all in its power to build the system. The Soviets were threatened because the Americans might have been able to make a nuclear first strike possible. In The Nuclear Predicament, Beckman claims that one of the central goals of Soviet diplomacy was to terminate SDI. A surprise attack from the Americans would destroy much of the Soviet ICBM fleet, allowing SDI to defeat a "ragged" Soviet retaliatory response. Furthermore, if the Soviets chose to enter this new arms race, they would further cripple their economy.  The Soviets could not afford to ignore Reagan's new endeavor, therefore their policy at the time was to enter negotiations with the Americans.  By 1987, however, the USSR withdrew its opposition, concluding the SDI posed no threat and scientifically "would never work".

SDI research went ahead, although it did not achieve the hoped-for result. SDI research was cut back following the end of Reagan's presidency, and in 1995 it was reiterated in a presidential joint statement that "missile defense systems may be deployed... [that] will not pose a realistic threat to the strategic nuclear force of the other side and will not be tested to... [create] that capability."  This was reaffirmed in 1997.

Theater Missile Defense negotiations
The ABM Treaty prohibited "National Missile Defense" (NMD), but some interpreted it to allow more limited systems called "Theater Missile Defense" (TMD). This is because Article II of the treaty defined "ABM Systems" as those that "counter strategic missiles", which are typically defined as those with "intercontinental capability". Thus, TMD supporters argued, the treaty did not prohibit systems that defended against the countering of theatre ballistic missiles. The US had already developed and used such systems, including the Patriot Missile during the Gulf War.

The problem arose as TMD systems could also potentially be capable of countering strategic ballistic missiles, not just theatre ballistic missiles. The Clinton administration began negotiations with the Russians in 1993 to make amendments to the treaty. After much discussion, Presidents Clinton and Boris Yeltsin signed addendum to the treaty on September 9, 1997. According to these new agreements, the treaty permitted missile defense systems to have a velocity up to 5 km/s as long as it had not been tested against targets traveling faster than 5 km/s.

The 1997 agreement were eventually ratified by the Russian parliament on May 4, 2000 (along with START II treaty). However, it was opposed in the US Senate by some Republican senators led by Jesse Helms. As a result, Clinton never submitted the agreement to Congress, fearing that Helms would stall their ratification or defeat it outright.

After the dissolution of the USSR; United States and Russia

Although the Soviet Union ceased to exist in December 1991, in the view of the U.S. Department of State, the treaty continued in force. Russia was confirmed as the USSR's successor state in January 1992. Belarus and Ukraine were treated as successors at the ABM review conference in October 1993 and Kazakhstan was added as a successor shortly after. Belarus, Ukraine and Kazakhstan became regular participants at ABM treaty meetings known as Standing Consultative Commissions. An additional memorandum of understanding was prepared in 1997, establishing Belarus, Kazakhstan, the Russian Federation, and Ukraine as successor states to the Soviet Union, for the purposes of the treaty. The US considered only extending the obligations to these countries, and not all, as only these ones had significant ABM assets. As the ABM treaty allowed for only a single ABM deployment, the State Department deemed that only a single ABM system would be collectively permitted among Russia, Ukraine, Kazakhstan and Belarus.

In the United States, there was a debate on whether after the dissolution of the USSR, the ABM Treaty was still in effect. A month after the USSR's dissolution, President George H. W. Bush affirmed the ABM Treaty and regarded Russia as USSR's successor. Russia also accepted the ABM Treaty. Later on, President Clinton would affirm the validity of the treaty, as would President George W. Bush (before he terminated it). However, some Americans (mostly conservative Republicans) argued that the treaty was not in effect because the USSR had no successor state. This was deemed inconsistent, as Russia did indeed inherit the USSR's obligations (including its UNSC seat, its debts, its agreements on nonproliferation etc.). Former CIA director James Woolsey argued that in order for the treaty to remain in force, both the US and Russia had to accept it, and that President Clinton could not accept it without Congressional approval. According to Michael J. Glennon, Congress acknowledged the treaty in 1996, when it passed a law restricting President Clinton's ability to modify the treaty.

United States withdrawal
On 13 December 2001, George W. Bush gave Russia notice of the United States' withdrawal from the treaty, in accordance with the clause that required six months' notice before terminating the pact—the first time in recent history that the United States has withdrawn from a major international arms treaty. This led to the eventual creation of the American Missile Defense Agency.

Supporters of the withdrawal argued that it was a necessity in order to test and build a limited National Missile Defense to protect the United States from nuclear blackmail by a rogue state. But, the withdrawal had many foreign and domestic critics, who said the construction of a missile defense system would lead to fears of a U.S. nuclear first strike, as the missile defense could blunt the retaliatory strike that would otherwise deter such a preemptive attack. John Rhinelander, a negotiator of the ABM treaty, predicted that the withdrawal would be a "fatal blow" to the Non-Proliferation Treaty and would lead to a "world without effective legal constraints on nuclear proliferation". Former U.S. Secretary of Defense William Perry also criticized the U.S. withdrawal as a very bad decision.

Russian response
Newly elected Russian president Vladimir Putin responded to the withdrawal by ordering a build-up of Russia's nuclear capabilities, designed to counterbalance U.S. capabilities, although he noted there was no immediate danger stemming from the US withdrawal.

Russia and the United States signed the Strategic Offensive Reductions Treaty in Moscow on 24 May 2002. This treaty mandates cuts in deployed strategic nuclear warheads, but without actually mandating cuts to total stockpiled warheads, and without any mechanism for enforcement.

On June 13, 2002, the US withdrew from ABM (having given notice 6 months earlier). The next day, Russia responded by declaring it would no longer abide by the START II treaty, which had not entered into force.

In interviews with Oliver Stone in 2017, Russian president Vladimir Putin said that in trying to persuade Russia to accept US withdrawal from the treaty, both Bill Clinton and George W. Bush had tried, without evidence, to convince him of an emerging nuclear threat from Iran.

On 1 March 2018, Russian president Vladimir Putin, in an address to the Federal Assembly, announced the development of a series of technologically new missile systems in response to U.S. withdrawal from the ABM Treaty. His statements were referred to by an anonymous US official under the Trump administration as largely boastful untruths. He said that the U.S. decision triggered him to order an increase in Russia's nuclear capabilities, designed to counterbalance U.S. ones. As recently as 2021, Putin cited U.S. withdrawal among his grievances against the West: "We tried to partner with the West for many years, but the partnership was not accepted, it didn’t work," often citing it as one of America's great post-Cold War sins.

References

External links

Anti-Ballistic Missile Treaty, official State Department site, includes the text of the treaty and the 1974 Protocol.
US Announcement of withdrawal (2001)

1972 in the Soviet Union
1972 in the United States
Arms control treaties
Cold War treaties
Missile defense
Soviet Union–United States treaties
Russia–United States relations
Nuclear weapons governance
Treaties concluded in 1972
Treaties entered into force in 1972
Presidency of Richard Nixon
1972 in politics
Nuclear technology treaties
Russia–United States military relations
Treaties of Belarus
Treaties of Kazakhstan
Treaties of Ukraine